Captain John Augustus Hervey, Lord Hervey, RN (1 January 1757 – 10 January 1796) was a British diplomat.

Hervey was the eldest surviving son of Frederick Hervey, 4th Earl of Bristol and his wife, Elizabeth née Davers (died 1800). He had two brothers, including Frederick, 1st Marquess of Bristol; and three sisters, Mary Creighton, Countess Erne, Elizabeth Cavendish, Duchess of Devonshire and Louisa Jenkinson, Countess of Liverpool.

Joining the Royal Navy, he reached the rank of Captain and was at one point the senior naval officer on the St. Lawrence River in Quebec. From 1787 to 1794, he was Minister to Tuscany. On 4 October 1779, he married Elizabeth Drummond (died 4 September 1818), the eldest daughter of Colin Drummond, of Megginch Castle, Perthshire, who was Commissary-General and Paymaster to the Forces in Canada. They had a daughter, Hon. Elizabeth Catherine Caroline (1780–1803), who married Charles Ellis, 1st Baron Seaford. On his death in 1796, his courtesy title was assumed by his brother, Frederick.

References

External links

British diplomats
Heirs apparent who never acceded
Royal Navy officers
1757 births
1796 deaths
John
British courtesy barons and lords of Parliament
Younger sons of earls